Andrew William Ramage (born 3 October 1974) was an English footballer. He made 13 appearances in The Football League for Gillingham.

After being forced to retire due to injury, he began working in oil brokerage in the City of London. He has subsequently become a self-help author, publishing the book "The 28 Day Alcohol-Free Challenge".

References

1974 births
English Football League players
English footballers
Gillingham F.C. players
Living people
Footballers from Barking, London
Association football midfielders